List of the members of the Faroese Løgting in the period 1984–1988. The parliament had 32 members this period.

Elected members of the Løgting

References 
«Løgtingið 150 – Hátíðarrit», vol. 2 (2002). (PDF)

 1984
1984 in the Faroe Islands
1985 in the Faroe Islands
1986 in the Faroe Islands
1987 in the Faroe Islands
1988 in the Faroe Islands
1984–1988